Janar is an Estonian masculine given name. People bearing the name Janar include:
Janar Soo (born 1991), Estonian basketball player
Janar Talts (born 1983), Estonian basketball player
Janar Toomet (born 1989), Estonian footballer

References

Estonian masculine given names